Pauline Diana Baynes (9 September 1922 – 1 August 2008) was an English illustrator, author, and commercial artist. She contributed drawings and paintings to more than 200 books, mostly in the children's genre. She was the first illustrator of some of J. R. R. Tolkien's minor works and of C. S. Lewis's Chronicles of Narnia.

Early life

Baynes was born on 9 September 1922 at 67 Brunswick Place, Hove, East Sussex, England. Her father was Frederick William Wilberforce Baynes (1887 – 1967) and her mother was Jessie Harriet Maude Baynes, née Cunningham (circa 1888 – 1958). Her only sibling was her elder sister, Angela Mary Baynes.

While she was still a baby, her family emigrated to India, where her father had been appointed a Commissioner (district official) in the British imperial Indian Civil Service, serving as a senior magistrate. The Bayneses divided their time between the city of Agra and a refuge from the midsummer heat in the hill town of Mussoorie. Baynes was happy in her expatriate infancy, loving her ayah (native nursemaid) and a pet monkey that had been trained to take tiffin at the tea table.

When she was five, her mother, who was in poor health, took both her daughters back to England. Baynes recalled crying herself to sleep on her journey home. The three returnees lived a nomadic life in Surrey, lodging with various friends and renting a series of rooms in boarding houses. Baynes's father stayed behind in India, licensed by his wife to feel "free to do as he pleased", but regularly rejoining his family for holidays in Switzerland.

Education

Baynes began her education at a convent school, where the nuns who taught her mocked her fantastical imagination, her homemade clothes and her ability to speak Hindi. Her unhappiness over their bullying was slightly mitigated when she learned that Rudyard Kipling, whom she admired, had experienced something similar.

When she was nine, she was sent to Beaufort School, an independent girls' boarding establishment, no longer extant, in Camberley. Her favourite subject there was art, "because it was easy". By the time that she left, she had already formed the ambition of becoming an illustrator. She liked Beaufort well enough to go back to it as a teacher for two years in her mid-twenties.

At fifteen, she followed her sister to the Farnham School of Art (now subsumed into the University for the Creative Arts). She spent two terms studying design, which was to become the foundation of her mature technique.

At nineteen, again like her sister, she won a place at the prestigious Slade School of Fine Art, just as it left its usual premises on the Gower Street campus of University College London to begin a period of wartime cohabitation with the Ruskin School of Drawing in the University of Oxford. Studying the work of the illustrators Gustave Doré, Edmund Dulac, Arthur Rackham, Ernest Shepard, R. S. Sherriffs, Rex Whistler, Jacques-Marie-Gaston Onfroy de Bréville ("Job") and the anonymous illuminators of mediaeval manuscripts, she became more convinced then ever that she had a vocation to follow in their footsteps. She was not a diligent student, frittering away her time on "coffee and parties", and she left the Slade without a qualification. She did, however, achieve the distinction, one shared with her sister, of exhibiting at the Royal Academy of Arts, in 1939.

War work and early career
In 1940, a year into World War II, both Baynes sisters joined the Women's Voluntary Service. The WVS sent them to the Camouflage Development Training Centre that the Royal Engineers had set up in Farnham Castle, where the sisters were put to work making models to be used as teaching aids. One of their colleagues at the centre was Powell Perry, whose family owned a company that published picture books for children. It was Perry who gave Baynes her first professional commissions. Among the Perry Colour Books to which she contributed were Question Mark, Wild Flower Rhymes and a novelization of the libretto of Mozart's opera The Magic Flute.

From 1942 until the end of the war, the Baynes sisters worked in the Admiralty Hydrographic Department in Bath, making maps and marine charts for the Royal Navy (an experience that stood Baynes in good stead in later life when she created maps of C. S. Lewis's Narnia and J. R. R. Tolkien's Middle-earth). A letter that she wrote to a friend at this time included a sketch that he passed on to Frank Whittaker, an employee of Country Life. Her friend's kindness resulted in commissions from the magazine to illustrate three books of fairy stories by Victoria Stevenson.

Baynes and J. R. R. Tolkien

Farmer Giles of Ham 
In 1948, after her brief interval of teaching at Beaufort, Baynes sought to develop her career by writing a book of her own – Victoria and the Golden Bird, a fantasy about a girl's magical visits to far-off countries – and by trying to secure work from a major London publisher. She sent George, Allen & Unwin a suite of comic reinterpretations of marginalia from the mediaeval Luttrell Psalter. It so happened that Professor J. R. R. Tolkien, author of Allen & Unwin's children's book The Hobbit, had recently offered the firm a mock-mediaeval comic novella called Farmer Giles of Ham. Allen & Unwin had commissioned illustrations for the story from Milein Cosman, but Tolkien had disliked them. On 5 August 1948, he complained to Ronald Eames, Allen & Unwin's art director, that they were "wholly out of keeping with the style or manner of the text". Five days later, Eames wrote to Baynes requesting specimen drawings for "an adult fairy story (complete with dragon and giant!)" that would require "some historical and topographical (Oxford and Wales) realism". She reassured Eames that she knew Oxford from having sketched there, and knew Wales from having picked Welsh potatoes. Visiting Allen & Unwin's offices at around the beginning of October to see what Baynes had produced for him, Tolkien was won over to her cause when Eames showed him her portfolio of Luttrell whimsies. The witty jeux d'esprit that she went on to create for his story delighted him. "They are more than illustrations", he wrote to Allen & Unwin on 16 March 1949, "they are a collateral theme. I showed them to my friends whose polite comment was that they reduced my text to a commentary on the drawings."

Tolkien was so pleased with Baynes's contributions to Farmer Giles that on 20 December 1949, he wrote to her expressing the wish that she would one day illustrate two other books that he was working on – the tales that would eventually become The Lord of the Rings and The Silmarillion. Tolkien's publishers thought differently, preferring to entrust his masterpieces to Alan Lee, Francis Mosley, Ted Nasmith and Ingahild Grathmer (a pseudonym of Margrethe II of Denmark). Ultimately Tolkien came to the view that Baynes would not have been the right artist to illustrate his greatest works, judging that they needed pictures "more noble or awe-inspiring" than she would have been able to produce.

The Adventures of Tom Bombadil 

In 1961 Tolkien turned to Baynes again when he was compiling an anthology of some of his shorter pieces of verse. "You seem able to produce wonderful pictures with a touch of 'fantasy'", he wrote on 6 December, "but primarily bright and clear visions of things that one might actually see". The Adventures of Tom Bombadil, featuring some of Baynes's most delicate and meticulous imagery, was published in 1962. Baynes told Tolkien that her favourite among the book's poems was The Hoard; only much later did she learn that her illustration for that particular poem had disappointed him – she had drawn a dragon facing away from the mouth of its cave and a knight without either a shield or a helmet, which he had thought looked implausible. He would also have preferred Tom Bombadil to have been shown on the front of the book rather than on the back, a wish which HarperCollins eventually granted when the book was reprinted in a pocket edition in 2014.

Cover art for The Hobbit and The Lord of the Rings 
In 1961 Puffin used a painting by Baynes for the cover of a paperback edition of The Hobbit. Three years later, Allen & Unwin published The Lord of the Rings in a three-volume deluxe hardback edition for which they asked Baynes to design a slipcase. Never having read the story, Baynes was faced with the prospect of having to plough through a thousand pages of narrative before picking up a brush. Her sister, who knew the book well, rescued her from her predicament by painting a panorama of Tolkien's characters and locales that Baynes was able to borrow from. The triptych that Baynes created became one of the most widely reproduced of all her paintings, being recycled for the iconic cover art of a one-volume paperback edition of The Lord of the Rings in 1968 and a three-volume Unwin Paperbacks version in 1981. Baynes also created an image of Aragorn's standard that was used to promote The Return of the King in a newspaper advertisement in October 1955.

Smith of Wootton Major 
In 1967 Baynes illustrated the last piece of Tolkien's fiction to be published in his lifetime, his allegorical short story Smith of Wootton Major. Ballantine's American edition of the book was issued with an alternative Baynes cover adapted from one of its interior illustrations. Yet another cover appeared when the book was reissued in the United Kingdom in 1975 in a second edition that was uniform with The Adventures of Tom Bombadil.

A Map of Middle-earth and There and Back Again: a Map of Bilbo's Journey Through Eriador and Rhovanion 
In 1969, while waiting for Tolkien to finish The Silmarillion, Allen & Unwin commissioned Baynes to paint a map of his Middle-earth. Tolkien supplied her with copies of the several, variously scaled graphpaper charts that he had made in the course of writing The Lord of the Rings, and also annotated her copy of the map that his son Christopher had produced for The Fellowship of the Ring in 1954. (Her Fellowship map, scribbled over with new place names and some barely legible notes on latitudes, ships, trees, horses, elephants and camels, was bought by Oxford's Bodleian Library in 2016 for roughly £60,000.) With the help of cartographers from the Bordon military camp in Hampshire, Baynes created a map that Allen & Unwin published as a poster in 1970. It was decorated with a header and footer showing some of Tolkien's characters, and also with vignettes of some of his stories' locations. He wrote that her ideas of the Teeth of Mordor, the Argonath, Barad-dûr and, especially, Minas Morgul were very similar to his own, although he was less happy with her images of his heroes and their enemies. (According to Baynes, Tolkien's wife Edith remarked on the poster's painting of a spider in a way which gave Baynes the impression that she had not read her husband's work.) A companion map of the sphere of action of The Hobbit. There and Back Again: a Map of Bilbo's Journey Through Eriador and Rhovanion, again embellished with topographical vignettes, was published by Allen & Unwin in 1971.

Bilbo's Last Song 

In 1974, a year after Tolkien's death, Allen & Unwin published his poem Bilbo's Last Song as Baynes's third and final Tolkien poster. Her painting showed a scene that Tolkien had first described in the closing pages of The Lord of the Rings: Sam, Merry and Pippin standing at the Grey Havens, watching an elven ship carrying Frodo, Bilbo, Elrond, Galadriel and Gandalf away from Middle-earth to the land of Aman. In 1990, the poem was reissued as a book with three parallel sequences of Baynes's paintings: one illustrating Bilbo's journey from Rivendell to the Undying Lands, one showing Bilbo in various states of repose and one depicting the events narrated in The Hobbit. (Some of the illustrations were omitted when the book was reissued by other publishers twelve years later.)

Poems and Stories and other works 
In 1978 Baynes painted a cover for a paperback edition of Tolkien's translations of Sir Gawain and the Green Knight, Pearl and Sir Orfeo.
In 1980 Allen & Unwin published Poems and Stories, a de luxe, boxed, single-volume anthology of several of Tolkien's shorter works. The book featured new illustrations by Baynes for the short story Leaf by Niggle, the verse drama The Homecoming of Beorhtnoth Beorhthelm's Son, Farmer Giles of Ham, The Adventures of Tom Bombadil and Smith of Wootton Major. It also included all of Baynes's original illustrations for the latter three titles, some revised with grey and orange tinting. Baynes used the opportunity provided by revisiting Tom Bombadil to rework her illustration for The Hoard to make its dragon and knight look the way Tolkien had wanted them to.

In 1999, half a century after her collaboration with Tolkien had begun, Baynes returned to Farmer Giles of Ham once again to add a map of the story's Little Kingdom. The book was published with the revised cover that Baynes had painted for its second edition in 1976. It was reissued with a modified version of this cover when it was published in a pocket-sized edition in 2014. Baynes's final Tolkien art was published in 2003, when an audiobook of Smith of Wootton Major and Leaf by Niggle was issued with a CD insert showing an image of Niggle painting his Great Tree that had been commissioned from Baynes in the 1970s but had thitherto remained unpublished.

Baynes and C. S. Lewis

The Chronicles of Narnia

When C. S. Lewis was sixteen he conceived the idea of a faun walking through a snowy forest carrying an umbrella and some parcels. In 1949, after ten years of false starts, the Oxford don and popular theologian finally completed a story about the country where the faun lived – the land of Narnia, where it was always winter but never Christmas. A close friend of Tolkien's, Lewis chose Baynes to illustrate his tale after enjoying her artwork for Farmer Giles of Ham. He had also, he later told her, been advised to seek her out by a bookshop assistant whom he had asked to recommend an artist who could draw children and animals. Baynes signed a contract with Lewis's publisher, Geoffrey Bles, on 13 August 1949, and delivered drawings, a coloured frontispiece and a cover design for the book during the first half of the following year. The Lion, the Witch and the Wardrobe was published on 16 October 1950. At Lewis's request, Baynes went on to illustrate all six of the book's sequels – Prince Caspian: the Return to Narnia (1951), The Voyage of the Dawn Treader (1952), The Silver Chair (1953), The Horse and His Boy (1954), The Magician's Nephew (The Bodley Head, 1955) and The Last Battle (The Bodley Head, 1956). Too unworldly to negotiate the royalties deal that would have made her a multi-millionaire, Baynes sold her work to Lewis's publishers for a flat fee of just £100 per book.

Baynes revisited The Chronicles of Narnia several times. When the books were issued as Puffin paperbacks between 1959 and 1965, Baynes created new covers for each of them as well as artwork for a slipcase. In the 1970s, she created a third set of covers when the books appeared in hardback in new editions published by The Bodley Head and Collins. In 1991, HarperCollins published a special edition of The Lion, the Witch and the Wardrobe with seventeen new paintings. In 1998, HarperCollins commemorated the centenary of Lewis's birth by reissuing the complete Chronicles with all of Baynes's original line illustrations tinted by her in watercolour. And in 2000, HarperCollins published a 50th anniversary edition of The Lion, the Witch and the Wardrobe including all of Baynes's illustrations from their 1991 edition as well as a full colour map of Narnia and its neighbouring lands that Baynes had painted for a poster issued in 1968.

Baynes also contributed to several Narnian spinoffs. Brian Sibley's The Land of Narnia, including many new paintings and drawings, appeared in 1989. In 1994, James Riordan's A Book of Narnians provided a portrait gallery of Narnia's dramatis personae. Among others of Baynes's Lewisiana were Douglas Gresham's The Official Narnia Cookbook, The Magical Land of Narnia Puzzle Book, Sibley and Alison Sage's A Treasury of Narnians, The Narnia Trivia Book, The Wisdom of Narnia and Narnia Chronology.

C. S. Lewis on Baynes
Lewis met Baynes on just three occasions – at his publisher's office, at a lunch party at Magdalen College on 31 December 1949 and at the Charing Cross Hotel in London on 1 January 1951. He found his young illustrator "good and beautiful and sensitive"; "la belle Baynes", he called her in a letter to George Sayer on 30 December 1950. Writing to his publisher, he said "Faith, 'twould be easier to be enamoured of her" than of her illustrations.

Lewis's letters to Baynes herself were effusive in their praise. Her drawings were "really excellent" with a "wealth of vigorous detail". She did "each book a little bit better than the last". Her Lasaraleen was "a rich feast of line & of fantastic-satiric imagination". Her Tisroc was "superb", her King Lune "really good", her Tashbaan "exactly right" and her flying horse Fledge "the real thing". When she congratulated him on winning the Carnegie literary award for The Last Battle, he replied "is it not really 'our' Medal? I'm sure the illustrations were taken into consideration as well as the text." Sometimes, though, he acknowledged her technical limitations. "If only you cd. take 6 months off and devote them to anatomy, there's no limit to your possibilities", he wrote. When he discussed Baynes with his friends, he revealed quite how much her work had disappointed him.

She had "Magna virtutes nec minora vitia" – great virtues, but vices no less great. The faces of her children were often "empty, expressionless and too alike". She couldn't draw lions. Indeed, "In quadrupeds claudicat" (she limps); she would profit from a visit to a zoo. A gnome of Bism looked like a "brat out of Dickens's London". A knight was wearing his shield on his right arm instead of his left, "What", he asked I. O. Evans, "is one to do with illustrators – especially if, like, mine, they are timid, shrinking young women who, when criticized, look as if you'd pulled their hair or given them a black eye? My resolution was exhausted by the time I'd convinced her that rowers face aft not (as she thinks) forward."

Lewis gave his fullest account of his opinion of Baynes in a letter that he wrote to his friend Dorothy L. Sayers on 5 August 1955. "The main trouble about Pauline B. is [...] her total ignorance of animal anatomy. In the v. last book [the fifth in the series] she has at last learned how to draw a horse. I have always had serious reservations about her [...]. But she had merits (her botanical forms are lovely), she needed the work (old mother to support, I think), and worst of all she is such a timid creature, so 'easily put down' that criticism cd. only be hinted [...]. At any real reprimand she'd have thrown up the job, not in a huff but in sheer, downright, unresenting, pusillanimous dejection. She is quite a good artist on a certain formal-fantastic level (did Tolkien's Farmer Giles far better than my books) but has no interest in matter – how boats are rowed, or bows shot with, or feet planted, or fists clenched. Arabesque is really her vocation."

Baynes on C. S. Lewis

Lewis in person made less of an impression on Baynes than she did on him. Thinking back to when they had met in the Charing Cross Hotel to discuss her drawings for Prince Caspian, she remembered little but his constantly checking the time lest he miss his train from Waterloo. Her most vivid recollection of their New Year's Eve lunch at Magdalen College was of his gleefully picking nuts out of a bowl of Brussels sprouts. As for the letters that they exchanged, a memoir that she wrote for Lewis's devotee Walter Hooper on 15 August 1967 said that she and Lewis "hardly corresponded at all [...]: he was, to me, the most kindly and tolerant of authors – who seemed happy to leave everything in my completely inexperienced hands! Once or twice I queried the sort of character he had in mind [...] and then he replied, but otherwise he made no remarks or criticisms, despite the fact that the drawings were very far from perfect [...]. When he did criticize, it was put over so charmingly, that it wasn't a criticism, i.e., I did the drawings as best as I could [...] and didn't realize how hideous I had made the children – they were as nice as I could get them – and Dr Lewis said, when we were starting on the second book, 'I know you made the children rather plain – in the interests of realism – but do you think you could possibly pretty them up a little now?' [...] He was invariably friendly and kind." In 1962, six years after the publication of the final Narnia story, Baynes retained enough good will towards Lewis to send him an aptly Narnian Christmas present, for which he thanked her in a note that said that he appreciated her "enduring White Witch even more than the transitory joys of the Turkish Delight." But learning from a 1988 biography of Lewis how he had complained about her behind her back both wounded her and made her see her relationship with him in a new, colder light. "One doesn't need to have liked him to admire him", she told her confidante Charlotte Cory. "He never became a friend."

Baynes's feelings about Lewis's books were conflicted too. She thought his stories "marvellous", but, although she was a Christian herself, she was uncomfortable with their Christian subtext. She claimed not to have identified the lion Aslan with Christ until after she had finished work on The Last Battle, despite have drawn him standing upright like a man in The Lion, the Witch and the Wardrobe. She regretted that her Narnian art had overshadowed the rest of her work and she was ruefully aware that a book collector would pay more for a first edition of The Lion, the Witch and the Wardrobe than she had been paid for illustrating it.

Baynes as author
In Baynes's later years commissions could be hard to come by - there were days when fan mail and a rejection letter would arrive in the same post. Baynes used her fallow periods to put together some books of her own. Several came from her delight in animals – The Elephant's Ball (based on a nineteenth-century narrative poem), How Dog Began (a Kiplingesque fable dedicated to eleven of her own pets) and Questionable Creatures (a pseudo-mediaeval, cryptozoological fantasia that only found an American publisher when Baynes agreed to paint out a mermaid's breasts). But most of Baynes's books were the fruit of her abiding interest in religion. Good King Wenceslas celebrated the famous Christmas carol; The Song of the Three Holy Children illustrated an apocryphal passage from the Book of Daniel; Noah and the Ark and In the Beginning were drawn from the Book of Genesis; Thanks Be to God was an international anthology of prayers; How excellent is thy name! illustrated Psalm 8; and I Believe illustrated the Nicene Creed.

Other works
The illustrations of which Baynes was most proud were the almost six hundred that she created for Grant Uden's A Dictionary of Chivalry, on which she laboured for nearly two years. They won her the Chartered Institute of Library and Information Professionals' Kate Greenaway Medal for the best book illustrations of 1968. (In 1972, Baynes achieved a runner-up's commendation in the Greenaway competition with her illustrations for Helen Piers's Snail and Caterpillar.) Among the other books in her bibliography are works by Richard Adams, Hans Christian Andersen, Enid Blyton, Rumer Godden, Roger Lancelyn Green, Jacob and Wilhelm Grimm, Rudyard Kipling, George MacDonald, Mary Norton, her friends Iona and Peter Opie, Beatrix Potter, Arthur Ransome, Alison Uttley and Amabel Williams-Ellis. Several of her commissions were the result of the bond that she formed with Puffin Books' Kaye Webb.

Baynes also contributed artwork to many magazines, including Holly Leaves, Lilliput, Puffin Post, The Sphere, The Tatler and The Illustrated London News (to which she was introduced by another of the ILN'''s artists, her friend and mentor Ernest Shepard). Stationery companies commissioned her to design Christmas cards – some of which are still reproduced decades after she painted them – and Huntley and Palmers employed her to advertise their biscuits. The Church of the Good Shepherd in her home village of Dockenfield has a pair of Baynes's stained glass windows. And for the Plymouth Congregational Church in Minneapolis, Baynes designed the largest pieces of crewel embroidery to be found anywhere in the world.

Personal life

When Baynes's father retired he left India and returned to England, settling with Baynes's mother in a house close to Baynes's own near Farnham in southwest Surrey. Long estranged, they maintained a pretence of marriage, but lived lives that were essentially separate. A mistress with whom Baynes's father had established a relationship in India followed him to Surrey and set up home nearby. Baynes looked after both her parents loyally, even when the burden of caring for them became so great that she could do her illustrating only in the small hours of the night.

In 1961, after many "interesting and highly enjoyable" but evanescent love affairs, Baynes answered a knock on her door from an itinerant dog's meat salesman. He was Friedrich Otto Gasch, usually known as Fritz. Born on 21 September 1919 in Auerswalde, Saxony, Germany, Gasch had served in Erwin Rommel's Afrika Korps during the Second World War, had been taken prisoner and had then been sent via the United States to an English PoW camp. Once the war had ended he had decided to adopt England as his home. A whirlwind courtship culminated in Baynes's and Gasch's marrying on 18 March 1961. "Meeting Fritz", Baynes said, "was the best thing that ever happened to me; he was a splendid man and a wonderful husband who was completely tolerant of his wife's obsession to draw!" The Gasches lived in Rock Barn Cottage, Heath Hill, Dockenfield, a two-bedroom bungalow formerly occupied by a farm labourer, in a village close to Farnham in the undulating countryside of the North Downs.Pauline D Gasch in the UK, Electoral Registers, 2003-2010 Their only child, a son, was stillborn. After retiring from work as a contract gardener, Gasch died on 28 October 1988 at the age of sixty-nine.

Two years after her husband died Baynes received a telephone call from a stranger. She was Karin Gasch (born 1942), a daughter of Gasch's by an earlier marriage in Germany, who had used the opportunity created by the collapse of the government of the German Democratic Republic to investigate what had happened to her father after the end of the war. Baynes formed an enduring and loving bond with Gasch's daughter and the rest of her step-family, and was happy to take on the unanticipated roles of mother, grandmother and great-grandmother. "It was", she said, "like something magical coming back at me through a wardrobe."

Among the friends with whom Baynes liked to discuss art, literature, religion and politics were the magician David Weeks and the writers Wayne G. Hammond, David Henshaw, Christina Scull and Brian Sibley. Baynes was also close to Tolkien, whose Christianity she approved of as "more rooted and unobtrusive" than Lewis's. After Tolkien and his wife had retired to Bournemouth Baynes and Gasch used to visit them and join them for holidays. The two old soldiers enjoyed swapping wartime reminiscences. After Tolkien died in 1973 Baynes and Gasch were among just twelve mourners whom his family invited to his funeral.

Baynes worked in a study crammed with the many eclectic books that she used as resources for research. Her desk was placed under a window overlooking the small high-hedged garden that her husband had created for her, and in which his ashes were scattered. She liked to draw and paint with her dogs dozing at her feet, and with the music of Handel in the background.

Death and legacy
Baynes died of ischaemic heart disease in Dockenfield at the age of 85, on 1 August 2008, leaving behind unpublished illustrations for The Quran, Aesop's Fables and Brian Sibley's Osric the Extraordinary Owl (the last of which was to make it into print thirteen years later). Her funeral was held in Dockenfield's Anglican church, and she was cremated at the Park Crematorium in Aldershot. The value of her estate at probate was £990,695 (2009) (£1.28m in 2021). She bequeathed her archive of several hundred drawings and paintings, her library of more than two thousand books and her intellectual property rights to the Oxford Programme of Williams College, Williamstown, Massachusetts, with a request that her collection should be housed in the college's Chapin Library of Rare Books. (The copyright in most of her Narnian artwork is owned by C. S. Lewis Pte Ltd, Lewis's literary estate.) There is a second, small Baynes archive at the University of Oregon. Her death was noted in obituaries in several newspapers. Sibley's, in The Independent, summed up the style of his friend thus: 

Baynes's standing in the pantheon of children's book illustrators is high, her drawings and paintings changing hands for sums typically in four figures.https://www.blackwell.co.uk/rarebooks/catalogues/pbaynesweb.pdf  
Most of the art that she created for Tolkien's and Lewis's books has remained continuously in print ever since it was first published. As of 1998, the Narnia stories alone had sold more than one hundred million copies. Baynes's paintings of Narnia have gained still wider currency through their use in featurettes in-home media releases of Hollywood's Chronicles of Narnia movies. Looking back after half a century, Baynes's verdict on her momentous trip through the back of Professor Kirke's wardrobe was down to earth. "I just thought of it as work."

Bibliography
(Where more than one edition of a book by Lewis or Tolkien is listed, it is because they have different illustrations.)

Books by or edited by BaynesVictoria and the Golden Bird, Blackie, 1948How Dog Began, Methuen, 1985The Song of the Three Holy Children, Methuen, 1986Good King Wenceslas. Lutterworth, 1987Noah and the Ark, Methuen, 1988In the Beginning, Dent, 1990 (issued in the US as Let There Be Light, Simon & Schuster, 1991)Thanks Be to God: Prayers from Around the World, Lutterworth, 1990I Believe: The Nicene Creed, Frances Lincoln, 2003Questionable Creatures, Frances Lincoln, 2006The Elephant's Ball, Eerdmans, 2007Psalm 8: How Excellent is Thy Name!, Marion E. Wade Center, 2007

Books by or related to C. S. Lewis
Gresham, Douglas: The Official Narnia Cookbook, HarperCollins, 1998
Lewis, C. S.: The Lion, the Witch and the Wardrobe, Bles, 1950; Puffin, 1959; Collins, 1974; HarperCollins, 1991, 1998 and 2000
—— Prince Caspian, Bles, 1951; Puffin, 1962; Collins, 1974; HarperCollins, 1998
—— The Voyage of the Dawn Treader, Bles, 1952; Puffin, 1965; Collins, 1974; HarperCollins, 1998
—— The Silver Chair, Bles, 1953; Puffin, 1965; Collins, 1974; HarperCollins, 1998
—— The Horse and His Boy, Bles, 1954; Puffin, 1965; Collins, 1974; HarperCollins, 1998
—— The Magician's Nephew, The Bodley Head, 1955; Puffin, 1963; The Bodley Head, 1975; HarperCollins, 1998
—— The Last Battle, The Bodley Head, 1956; Puffin, 1964; The Bodley Head, 1977; HarperCollins, 1998
—— (adapted): A Map of Narnia and the Surrounding Countries, poster, Collins, 1968
—— (adapted): The Magical Land of Narnia Puzzle Book, HarperCollins, 1998
—— (adapted): The Narnia Trivia Book, HarperCollins, 1999
—— (adapted): The Wisdom of Narnia, HarperCollins, 2001
—— (adapted): Narnia Chronology, HarperCollins, 2008
Riordan, James: A Book of Narnians, HarperCollins, 1994
Sibley, Brian: The Land of Narnia, HarperCollins, 1989
Sibley, Brian and Sage, Alison: A Treasury of Narnia, HarperCollins, 1989

Books by J. R. R. TolkienFarmer Giles of Ham, Allen & Unwin, 1949; HarperCollins, 1999 and 2014The Hobbit, Puffin, 1961 [cover only]The Adventures of Tom Bombadil, Allen & Unwin, 1962; HarperCollins, 2014Smith of Wootton Major, Allen & Unwin, 1967; Ballantine, 1969; Allen and Unwin, 1975; HarperCollins, 2015The Lord of the Rings, 3-volume de luxe edition, Allen & Unwin, 1964 [slipcase only ]The Lord of the Rings, paperback, Allen & Unwin, 1968 [cover only]A Map of Middle-Earth, poster, Allen & Unwin, !970There and Back Again: a Map of Bilbo's Journey Through Eriador and Rhovanion, poster, Allen & Unwin, 1971Bilbo's Last Song, poster, Allen & Unwin, 1974Sir Gawain and the Green Knight, Pearl and Sir Orfeo, Unwin Paperbacks, 1978 [cover only]The Fellowship of the Ring, Unwin Paperbacks, 1981 [cover only]The Two Towers, Unwin Paperbacks, 1981 [cover only]The Return of the King, Unwin Paperbacks, 1981 [cover only]Poems and Stories, Allen & Unwin, 1981Bilbo's Last Song, Unwin Hyman, 1990
 Smith of Wootton Major and Leaf by Niggle, audiobook, HarperCollins, 2003

Books by other authors
Adams, Richard: Watership Down, Puffin, 1972 [cover and maps]
Alexander, Cecil Frances: All Things Bright and Beautiful, Lutterworth, 1986
Andersen, Hans Christian: Andersen's Fairy Tales, Blackie, 1949
—— Stories from Hans Christian Andersen selected by Philippa Pearce, Collins, 1972
Backway, Monica: Hassan of Basorah, Blackie, 1958
Barber, Richard: A Companion to World Mythology, Kestrel, 1979
Bate, Joan Mary: The Curious Tale of Cloud City, Blackie, 1958
de Beaumont, Jeanne-Marie Leprince: Beauty and the Beast, Perry Colour Books, 1942
Bebbington, William George: And It Came to Pass, Allen & Unwin, 1951
Blackmore, R. D.: Lorna Doone, Collins, 1970
Blyton, Enid et al.: The Wonder Book for Children, Odhams, 1948
Blyton, Enid: The Land of Farbeyond, Methuen, 1973
Borer, Mary Cathcart: Don Quixote: Some of His Adventures, Longman, 1960
—— Boadicea, Longman, 1965
—— Christopher Columbus, Longman, 1965
—— Joan of Arc, Longman, 1965
—— King Alfred the Great, Longman, 1965
Bremer, Francis J.: The Puritan Experiment, St James, 1977
Bunyan, John: The Pilgrim's Progress, Blackie, 1949
Burrough, Loretta: Sister Clare, W. H. Allen, 1960
Carroll, Lewis: Alice in Wonderland and Through the Looking-Glass, Blackie, 1950
Clark, Leonard: All Along Down Along, Longman, 1971
Cockrill, Pauline: The Little Book of Celebrity Bears, Dorling Kindersley, 1992
Denton, E. M.: Stars and Candles, Ernest Benn, 1958
Dickinson, Peter: The Iron Lion, Blackie, 1983
Dickinson, William Croft: Borrobil, Puffin, 1973
Ensor, Dorothy: The Adventures of Hatim Tai, Harrap, 1960
Field, William: An Historical and Descriptive Account of the Town and Castle of Warwick and the Neighbouring Leamington Spa, S. R. Publishers, 1969
Foreman, Michael: Sarah et le Cheval de Sable, Deflandre Francoise, 1997
Gail, Marzieh: Avignon in Flower, 1304 - 1403, Victor Gollancz, 1966
Garnett, Emmeline: The Civil War 1640 - 1660, A. & C. Black, 1956
Godden, Rumer: The Dragon of Og, Macmillan, 1981
—— Four Dolls, Macmillan, 1983
—— The Little Chair, Hodder, 1996
Greaves, Margaret: The Naming, Dent, 1992
Green, Roger Lancelyn: The Tale of Troy, Puffin, 1970
—— Tales of the Greek Heroes, Puffin, 1983
Grimm, Jacob and Wilhelm: Grimm's Fairy Tales, Blackie, 1949
Harris, Rosemary: The Moon in the Cloud, Puffin, 1978 [cover only]
—— The Shadow on the Sun, Puffin, 1978 [cover only]
—— The Bright and Morning Star, Puffin, 1978 [cover only]
—— The Enchanted Horse, Kestrel, 1981
—— Love and the Merry-go-round, Hamish Hamilton, 1988
—— Colm of the Islands, Walker, 1989
Harvey, David: Dragon Smoke and Magic Song, Allen & Unwin, 1984
Haskell, Arnold L. (ed.): The Ballet Annual 1951, A. & C. Black, 1951
Hawkins, Robert Henry: Primary English Practice, Longman, 1958
Henshall, David: Starchild and Witchfire, Macmillan, 1991
Hickman, G. M. and Mayo, R. Elizabeth: Adventures at Home: Pilgrim Way Geographies, Book 1, Blackie, 1961
Hickman, G. M.: Adventuring Abroad: Pilgrim Way Geographies, Book 2, Blackie, 1962
Hieatt, Constance B.: The Joy of the Court, Thomas Y. Crowell, 1971
Hitchcock, Albert: Great People Through the Ages, Blackie, 1954
—— The British People: Their Work & Way of Life, Blackie, 1955
Homans, Abigail Adams: Education by Uncles, Houghton Mifflin, 1966
Hughes, Arthur George: Ali Baba and Aladdin, Longman, 1960
Hume, Emily Gertrude: Days Before History, Blackie, 1952
—— Children Through the Ages, Blackie, 1953
Hunter, Eileen: Tales of Way-Beyond, Andre Deutsch, 1979
Jekyll, Lady Agnes: Kitchen Essays, Collins, 1969
Jenkins, A. E.: Titterstone Clee Hills: Everyday Life, Industrial History and Dialect, A. E. Jenkins, 1982
Jones, Gwyn: Welsh Legends and Folk Tales, Puffin, 1979
Kipling, Rudyard: How the Whale Got His Throat, Macmillan, 1983
Koralek, Jenny: The Cobweb Curtain: a Christmas Story, Methuen, 1989
—— The Moses Basket, Frances Lincoln, 2003
—— The Coat of Many Colours, Frances Lincoln, 2004
Krutch, Joseph Wood: The Most Wonderful Animals That Never Were. Houghton Mifflin, 1969
Lethbridge, Katherine Greville: The Rout of the Ollafubs, Faber & Faber, 1964
Llewellyn, Bernard: China's Courts and Concubines: Some People in China's History, Allen & Unwin, 1956
MacBeth, George: The Story of Daniel, Lutterworth, 1986
MacDonald, George: The Princess and the Goblin, Puffin, 1971 [cover only]
—— The Princess and Curdie, Puffin, 1966 [cover only]
Malcolmson, Anne Burnett: Miracle Plays: Seven Medieval Plays for Modern Players, Constable, 1960
Markham, George (ed. Lucid, Dan): The Compleat Horseman, Robson, 1976
Mitchison, Naomi: Graeme and the Dragon, Faber & Faber, 1954
Morris, James (subsequently Jan): The Upstairs Donkey and Other Stolen Stories, Faber & Faber, 1962
Muir, Lynette: The Unicorn Window, Abelard-Schuman, 1961
Nicolas, Claude and Roels, Iliane: How Life Goes On: the Butterfly, Chambers, 1974
—— How Life Goes On: the Duck, Chambers, 1975
—— How Life Goes On: the Bee and the Cherry Tree, Chambers, 1976
—— How Life Goes On: the Salmon. Chambers, 1976
—— How Life Goes On; the Dolphin, Chambers, 1977
—— How Life Goes On: the Frog, Chambers, 1977
—— How Life Goes On; the Roe Deer, Chambers, 1977
Norton, Mary: The Borrowers, Puffin, 1984 [cover only]
—— The Borrowers Aloft, Puffin, ?1984 [cover only]
—— The Borrowers Afloat, Puffin, ?1984 [cover only]
—— The Borrowers Afield, Puffin, ?1984 [cover only]
—— The Borrowers Avenged, Kestrel, 1982
Nuttall, Kenneth: Let's Act, Book 4, Longman, 1960
Opie, Iona and Peter: The Puffin Book of Nursery Rhymes, Puffin, 1963
—— A Family Book of Nursery Rhymes, Oxford University Press, 1964
Peppin, Anthea: The National Gallery Children's Book, National Gallery, 1983
Perry, Powell: Question Mark, Perry Colour Books, ?1942
—— Wild Flower Rhymes, Perry Colour Books, ?1942
—— Oldebus, Perry Colour Books, 1945
—— Jumblebus 10, Perry Colour Books, 1951
Phillips, Marjorie: Annabel and Bryony, Oxford University Press, 1953
Piers, Helen: Snail and Caterpillar, Longman Young, 1972
—— Grasshopper and Butterfly, Kestrel, 1975
—— Frog and Water Shrew. Kestrel, 1981
Potter, Beatrix: Country Tales, Frederick Warne, 1987
—— Wag-by-Wall, Frederick Warne, 1987
Pourrat, Henri: A Treasury of French Tales, Allen & Unwin, 1953
Power, Rhoda D.: From the Fury of the Northmen, Houghton Mifflin, 1957
Pridham, Radost: A Gift from the Heart: Folk Tales from Bulgaria, Methuen, 1966
Ransome, Arthur: Old Peter's Russian Tales, Puffin, 1974 [cover only] 
Ray, Elizabeth: The Resourceful Cook, Macmillan, 1978 [cover only]
Schikaneder, Emanuel (adapted by Perry, Powell): The Magic Flute, Perry Colour Books, 1943 
Sewell, Anna: Black Beauty, Puffin, 1954 [cover only]
Sibley, Brian: Osric the Extraordinary Owl, Jay Johnstone, 2021
Spenser, Edmund (ed. Warburg, Sandol Stoddard): Saint George and the Dragon, Houghton Mifflin, 1963
Squire, Geoffrey: The Observer's Book of European Costume, Frederick Warne, 1975
Stevenson, Victoria: Clover Magic, Country Life, 1944
—— The Magic Footstool, Country Life, 1946
—— The Magic Broom, Country Life, 1950
Stewart, Katie: The Times Cookery Book, Collins, 1972
Swift, Jonathan: Gulliver's Travels, Blackie, 1950
Symonds, John: Harold: the Story of a Friendship, Dent, 1973 [cover only]
Tower, Christopher: Oultre Jourdain, Weidenfeld & Nicolson, 1980
Uden, Grant: A Dictionary of Chivalry, Longman, 1968
Uttley, Alison: The Little Knife Who Did All the Work: Twelve Tales of Magic, Faber & Faber, 1962
—— Recipes From an Old Farmhouse, Faber & Faber, 1966
Westwood, Jennifer: Medieval Tales, Rupert Hart-Davis, 1967
—— The Isle of Gramarye: an Anthology of the Poetry of Magic, Rupert Hart-Davis, 1970
—— Tales and Legends, Rupert Hart-Davis, 1972
Williams, Ursula Moray: The Adventures of the Little Wooden Horse, Puffin, 1985 [cover only]
—— The Further Adventures of Gobbolino and the Little Wooden Horse, Puffin, 1984
Williams-Ellis, Amabel: The Arabian Nights, Blackie, 1957
—— Fairy Tales from the British Isles, Blackie, 1960
—— More British Fairy Tales, Blackie, 1965
Various: Puffin Annual No. 1, Puffin, 1974
—— Puffin Annual No. 2, Puffin, 1975

 References 

External links
 Pauline Baynes tribute site
 
 The Woman Who Drew Narnia: Pauline Baynes by Charlotte Cory (mid-1990s)
 Obituary, The Independent, 6 August 2008
 Obituary, The Guardian, 6 August 2008
 Obituary, The Times'', 8 August 2008 
 Death notice, Wayne Hammond and Christina Scull announce Pauline Baynes death to the Mythopoeic Society, 2 August 2008
 

1922 births
2008 deaths
Alumni of the Slade School of Fine Art
British children's book illustrators
British fantasy writers
British illustrators
British speculative fiction artists
English children's book illustrators
British women illustrators
English fantasy writers
English illustrators
Fantasy artists
20th-century illustrators of fairy tales
21st-century illustrators of fairy tales
Kate Greenaway Medal winners
People from Agra
People from Farnham
People from Hove
Tolkien artists
Writers who illustrated their own writing